Skyway Park is a  park being developed in Jersey City, New Jersey on the Hackensack River, partly under the Pulaski Skyway, from which it takes its name. The brownfield land was the site of the PJP Landfill. It is a component of the Hackensack RiverWalk, a linear park along the banks of the river and Newark Bay.

Brownfield site
The United States Environmental Protection Agency declared the parcel at the PJP Landfill a Superfund site in 1982 and the landfill was capped in 1985.

This property was to be capped and a warehouse constructed, while the rest of the property owned by AMB would be turned into greenspace. The Remedial Action Construction began in 2008. It has been redeveloped, and is home to a warehouse and a walkway. The remaining portion of the site is managed by Waste Management of New Jersey, Inc. and CWM Chemical Services, LLC (collectively “CCS”), which are responsible for a multi-layer, modified solid waste cap, wetlands reconstruction and enhancement efforts, and environmental monitoring.

Location and design
Initially introduced as Marion Greenway Park, the project first received funding in 2009.
The park is in the Marion Section on the West Side of the city between U.S. Route 1/9 Truck and the Hackensack River, north of Lincoln Park, with which it has the potential to be connected as part of the Hackensack RiverWalk project.

Covid memorial
The park will include one of the first memorials in North America for victims of the coronavirus pandemic. The site will have one tree planted for each Jersey City resident who died of the disease.

References

External links 
Skyway Park Conservancy
Jersey City Park System

Parks in Hudson County, New Jersey
Geography of Jersey City, New Jersey